Duration of a project's terminal element is the number of calendar periods it takes from the time the execution of element starts to the moment it is completed. 

Duration should not be confused with work. E.g. it takes three days for a snail-mail letter to arrive at point B from point A, whereas the work put into mailing it may be 0.5 hours. 

Strictly speaking, the phrase Duration of terminal element X is 5 days is incomplete. It fails to specify the following:
 the probability with which the completion is expected in the time allotted (since any estimate is only a prediction about the uncertain future, see critical chain)
 the resources to be used (sometimes using more resources or different resources speeds things up)
 the assumptions which were made
 the author of the estimation
 the date the estimate was made
 the work schedule of the resources
 etc. 

So the improved statement could read:
I, Marek Kowalczyk, as of 27 March 2005 strongly believe that if I fully applied myself to competing terminal element X and worked 8 hours a day every day, including holidays, and had all the materials at hand, then I would have completed it in 5 calendar days.' See metamodeling. 

It may seem unwieldy to use such complicated statements, but lack of detail often leads to misunderstanding.

See also
Student syndrome

Schedule (project management)